Victor (Henri) Staub (16 October 1872 – 4 February 1953) was a French pianist and composer.

Life
Born in Lima, Peru, to Swiss-French parents, Staub exhibited an early aptitude for the piano. He studied at the Paris Conservatoire with Antoine Marmontel and Louis Diémer, gaining a first prize in piano in 1888.

Staub competed in the Anton Rubinstein prize in Berlin in 1895. He and Josef Lhévinne both played Beethoven's Hammerklavier Sonata, Op. 106. In the first round of voting, Staub and Lhévinne obtained the same number of votes, but Lhévinne was ultimately awarded the 5,000 franc first prize after a second round of voting.

Staub taught for five years at the Cologne conservatory. He left Cologne in 1902 and returned to Paris.

He became a professor at the Paris Conservatoire on 21 October 1909, in succession to Edouard Risler. Upon the death of Elie Delaborde in 1914, Gabriel Fauré chose Staub over Marguerite Long to head the Classe Supérieure for women. Staub's female pupils included Germaine Devèze, Madeleine Giraudeau, Jacqueline Pangnier (Robin), Hélène Pignari, and Rita Savard. He also taught José Iturbi, Ernest Hoffzimmer, and Raymond Trouard. Staub retired from the Conservatoire on 15 January 1941 and was succeeded by Armand Ferté.

Victor Staub recorded Chopin's Waltz in F, Op. 34, No. 3; Debussy's Ménéstrels; and Schumann's Des Abends.

He composed numerous piano pieces, including most notably "Sous bois" (1902) and "Boléro" (1924), as well as his piano arrangement of the Sorcerer's Apprentice by Paul Dukas. He also authored pedagogical works.

Raymond Trouard recalled that:
Staub could play like no one else. One morning (I had come in a little early), I saw him arrive calmly, sit down at the keyboard and perform, for himself, without any warning, Liszt's "Feux-Follets" impeccably! Staub had memorized the Etudes Transcendantes, Chopin's op. 10 and 25 Etudes, as well as most of the difficult works of the repertoire. Only a handful of pianists could boast of being able to do the same."

Personal life
The son of Henri Staub (Zurich 1845 - Paris 1906) and Isabelle Merey (1847–1907), Victor Staub had three sisters: Emma, Béatrice, and Mercedes. With his first wife, Blanche Marie de Orelly (1882–1906)not children. Victor Staub He then married Marie Marguerite Emilie Baneux (1882–1958) and had a daughter, Odette Blanche Staub (Diana Staub, pianiste (1908–2000). Odette was the mother of actor Jean Claudio.

Victor Staub lived at 27 rue Fourcroy, in Paris, where he also gave private lessons for "professionals, amateurs, and children". He died in Paris.

Works
Solo piano

Piano 4-hands
 Trois Pièces: En trottinant, Marche; En dansant, Valse; En chantant, Sérénade (1909)

Opérette
 Les Quatre fils Aymon, one act (performed at the Cercle des Joyeux, 19 December 1888)

Chansons
 L'Heure délicieuse (Lucien Marotte), 1910
 L'Heure silencieuse (Lucien Marotte), 1910

Notes

External links
 
 Photograph of Victor Staub with his students during the 1929-1930 academic year.
 Photograph of Victor Staub with his students in 1931.
 "Sous-bois" by Victor Staub
 "Bolero" by Victor Staub
 Performance of Paul Dukas's "L'apprenti sorcier," arranged by Victor Staub, performed by Yuja Wang

1872 births
1953 deaths
19th-century classical composers
19th-century French male musicians
20th-century classical composers
20th-century French male musicians
French male classical composers
French Romantic composers